"Honolulu Baby" is a song written by Marvin Hatley for the 1933 Laurel and Hardy film Sons of the Desert. Ty Parvis performed the song in the film, which is later performed by Oliver Hardy.

Other versions 

The song has been covered by the Weintraub Syncopators, by Anton Szandor LaVey on his album Satan Takes a Holiday and by Kaʻau Crater Boys on their album Friends of the Ocean. A football chant to the tune of the song is also sung by fans of the football team Sheffield Wednesday.
The song was performed by the Little Rascals in the film Beginner's Luck (1935).

References

External links 
 
 

Laurel and Hardy
Songs written for films
1933 songs